Zoila La Rosa Cajo (born 31 May 1990) is a Peruvian female volleyball player. She was part of the Peru women's national volleyball team at the 2010 FIVB Volleyball Women's World Championship in Japan.

Clubs
  Divino Maestro (2010)
  USMP (2011-2016)
  Volley club Marcq-en-Baroeul Lille Métropole (2016-2020)
  Municipal Olympique Mougins Volley Ball (2020-2021)

References

1990 births
Living people
Peruvian women's volleyball players
Volleyball players at the 2007 Pan American Games
Pan American Games competitors for Peru
21st-century Peruvian women